Francisco Javier Alvarez is an American actor, known for his role as Agustín Lanuez in the HBO series Looking, and its subsequent series finale television film, Looking: The Movie.

Early life and education
Alvarez's parents are originally from Cuba, his father from Havana, and his mother from Artemisa. He is first-generation American and was born and raised in Miami, Florida. Alvarez grew up with the arts in his family: his grandmother was an opera singer in Cuba, while his father played music in a band in Puerto Rico, his mother was a ballerina, and his three sisters all performed in the Miami City Ballet. Spanish was his first language, and he did not learn English until he was 7 or 8 years old, stating that he started learning English from watching baseball. While growing up, he attended an all-boys Jesuit prep school. Alvarez originally enrolled at Florida State University as a Creative Writing major, but applied to the fine arts program after a positive experience in the School of Theatre. He then graduated with a Bachelor of Fine Arts and moved to New York City, and was encouraged by a friend to apply to Juilliard School. He used a bilingual version of the balcony scene from Romeo and Juliet for his callback and was accepted into the program and received the Raul Julia Memorial Scholarship. He graduated from Juilliard in 2010.

Acting career

Stage
While attending Juilliard, Alvarez trained at the Chautauqua Theater Company, appearing as Bernard in Death of a Salesman and Puck in A Midsummer Night's Dream in 2008.
 Alvarez portrayed the titular character in Brain Trust Production's The Tragedie of Cardenio at the 2010 Midtown International Theatre Festival, for which he won the award for Outstanding Lead Actor in a Play. After graduating from school, Alvarez performed in regional theater, landing his first professional acting role in a national tour production of Ramona Quimby, based on the popular children's book series. He continued to perform in regional theater, cast in a production of Julius Caesar as Lucius and Metellus Cimber and in Measure for Measure as Claudio for the 2011 Oregon Shakespeare Festival. His performances at the Oregon Shakespeare Festival resulted in his recruitment to Asolo Repertory Theatre, where he received praise for his lead role of Hamlet in the theatre's production of Hamlet: Prince of Cuba, a Spanish and English-language adaptation of the Shakespeare play reset in 19th century Havana. The play was translated into Spanish by Nilo Cruz and Alvarez studied the play for almost a year and learned to perform it in both Spanish and English. He later performed in the Actors Theatre of Louisville's 2013 production of The Whipping Man, where he portrayed Caleb, a wounded Jewish Confederate soldier in the American Civil War. The play received positive reviews, and Alvarez received praise for his "nuanced and empathetic" performance. He and friend Gabriel Ebert collaborated on the musical Those Lost Boys, about the one-night-only 10 year reunion of a rockstar band, which was developed and premiered at the 2013 Ars Nova All New Talent Fest and headlined the Ars Nova All New Talent Fest again in 2014.

Television
Alvarez appeared as a recurring minor role on the NBC television show Smash before landing his first major television role was the 2014 HBO series Looking as the main character Agustín, alongside co-stars Jonathan Groff and Murray Bartlett. The show focuses on the lives of three young gay men living in San Francisco. Alvarez originally auditioned for the role of recurring character Richie Ventura (played by Raúl Castillo), the love interest for Groff's character, Patrick, performing in a casting session over Skype. He was later asked to submit auditions for the role of Agustín. Within the week of his show at Actors Theatre of Louisville closing, he flew out for a second audition and was cast as Agustín. According to Alvarez, the character of Agustín was originally intended to be Venezuelan, rather than Cuban, spoke with an accent, and would be "figuring out his green card situation." Alvarez spoke with series creator Michael Lannan and the character was changed to a highly educated native U.S. citizen of Cuban descent, using some of Alvarez's personal traits, producing a portrayal of bicultural Latin-Americans that Alvarez felt was not seen as frequently in media. His performance garnered him praise from critics and a nomination for Best Supporting Actor by the Imagen Foundation Awards in 2014.

Audio book narration
Alvarez is also an audiobook narrator, appearing on the Oregon Shakespeare Festival's audio recording of Measure for Measure, and narrating audiobook works such as Héctor Tobar's The Barbarian Nurseries, Justin Torres's We the Animals, and Sebastian Rotella's Triple Crossing.

Accolades
While attending Juilliard, Alvarez was the recipient of the prestigious Raul Julia Memorial Scholarship. In 2010, his performance in The Tragedie of Cardenio by Ben Bartolone earned him the Midtown International Theatre Festival's award for "Outstanding Lead Actor in a Play". His performance as Agustín in Looking also earned him a nomination for the Imagen Foundation Award's "Best Supporting Actor" in 2014.

Personal life
Alvarez met his wife, Leah Walsh, as a first year student while both attended Juilliard, his wife a second year student. They married in May 2013. Walsh is also an actress and the couple live together in Astoria, Queens in New York City.

Filmography

Film

Television

Theatre

Audiobooks

Notes

External links
 

Living people
American entertainers of Cuban descent
American male stage actors
American male television actors
Audiobook narrators
Florida State University alumni
Hispanic and Latino American male actors
Juilliard School alumni
Male actors from Miami
Male actors from New York City
People from Astoria, Queens
Year of birth missing (living people)
21st-century American male actors